Big Brother 5 is the season of various versions of Big Brother and may refer to:

Big Brother 2005 (Netherlands), the 2005 Dutch edition of Big Brother
Gran Hermano Spain (season 5), the 2003-2004 edition of Big Brother in Spain
Grande Fratello Season 5, the second 2004 edition of Big Brother in Italy
Big Brother 5 (UK), the 2004 UK edition of Big Brother
Big Brother 5 (U.S.), the 2004 U.S. edition of Big Brother
Big Brother Germany (season 5), the 2004-2005 German edition of Big Brother
Big Brother Australia 2005, the 2005 Australian edition of Big Brother
Big Brother Brasil 5, the 2005 Brazilian edition of Big Brother
Gran Hermano Argentina (Season 5), the second 2007 Argentinian edition of Big Brother
Loft Story (Canada) Season 5, the French-Canadian 2008 edition of Big Brother in Canada
Big Brother 5 (Croatia), the 2008 Croatian edition of Big Brother
Big Brother 2009 (Finland), the 2009 edition of Big Brother in Finland
Big Brother Africa (season 5), the 2010 African edition of Big Brother
Big Brother 5 (Greece), the 2010-2011 Greek edition of Big Brother
Secret Story 2011 (France), the 2011 edition of Big Brother in France
Big Brother 2011 (Sweden), the 2011 Swedish edition of Big Brother
Bigg Boss (season 5), the 2011-2012 edition of Big Brother in India
Big Brother 5 (Albania), the 2012 Albanian edition of Big Brother
Big Brother 2013 (Denmark), the 2013 Danish edition of Big Brother
HaAh HaGadol 5, the 2013 edition of Big Brother in Israel
Secret Story 5 (Portugal), the 2014 edition of Big Brother in Portugal
Big Brother 5 (Bulgaria), the 2015 Bulgarian edition of Big Brother in Bulgaria
Big Brother Canada (season 5), the 2017 edition of Big Brother Canada

See also
 Big Brother (franchise)
 Big Brother (disambiguation)